Matthias Askew (born July 1, 1982) is a former American football defensive tackle. He was drafted by the Cincinnati Bengals in the fourth round of the 2004 NFL Draft. He played college football at Michigan State.

Askew has also been a member of the Washington Redskins and Denver Broncos.

College career
Askew started 19 of 35 games during his career at Michigan State University, recording 144 tackles with seven sacks, 18.5 stops for losses, 24 quarterback pressures, an interception and eight pass deflections.

Professional career

Cincinnati Bengals
Askew was drafted in the 2004 NFL Draft by Cincinnati after leaving college early to declare for the NFL draft. He was projected by many to be a possible first round pick the following year had he stayed in school.

The Bengals waived Askew during the 2006 pre-season shortly after he was arrested for resisting arrest earlier in the summer. During the arrest he was tasered. Later he had brought suit against the city of Cincinnati, and charges were dropped.

Washington Redskins
On August 13, 2007, Askew signed with the Washington Redskins. However, he was released at the conclusion of the preseason on September 1 and spent the season out of football.

Askew was re-signed by the Redskins on March 17, 2008. He was released again during final cuts on August 30.

Denver Broncos
Askew was signed to the practice squad of the Denver Broncos on November 3, 2008. He was waived on September 4, 2009.

Detroit Lions
Askew was signed to the Detroit Lions practice squad on September 23, 2009.

Toronto Argonauts
On October 20, 2010, Askew signed a practice roster agreement with the Toronto Argonauts of the Canadian Football League. He was released by the Argonauts on June 8, 2011.

Legal issues

In 2006, Askew was arrested after he refused to move his parked car out of an illegal parking spot. He was tasered by police during the incident. He is currently suing the city after the charges were dropped.

References

External links
Toronto Argonauts bio
Detroit Lions bio
Denver Broncos bio
Michigan State Spartans bio

1982 births
Living people
Players of American football from Fort Lauderdale, Florida
Players of Canadian football from Fort Lauderdale, Florida
American football defensive tackles
Michigan State Spartans football players
Cincinnati Bengals players
Washington Redskins players
Denver Broncos players
Detroit Lions players